KIYK (107.3 FM) is an American radio station broadcasting a country music format. Licensed to St. George, Utah, United States, the station is owned by Townsquare Media.

KIYK was granted a U.S. Federal Communications Commission construction permit to move to 107.3 MHz and decrease HAAT to 568.4 meters and the frequency shift took place on July 12, 2013.

On October 10, 2022 KIYK rebranded as "Cat Country 107.3/94.9".

Previous logo

References

External links

IYK
Radio stations established in 1973
1973 establishments in Utah
Country radio stations in the United States
Townsquare Media radio stations